The 2001 season was the 79th season of competitive football in Ecuador.

National leagues

Serie A
Champion: Emelec (9th title)
International cup qualifiers:
2002 Copa Libertadores: Emelec, El Nacional, Olmedo
Relegated: Delfín, LDU Portoviejo

Serie B
Winner: LDU Quito (2nd title)
Promoted: LDU Quito, Deportivo Cuenca
Relegated: Deportivo Quevedo

Segunda
Winner: Manta
Promoted: Manta

Clubs in international competitions

National teams

Senior team
The Ecuador national team played in fourteen matches in 2001: eight FIFA World Cup qualifiers, three Copa América matches, and three friendlies. At the end of the year, the team qualified for their first FIFA World Cup.

2002 FIFA World Cup qualifiers
Ecuador finished their qualifying campaign to the 2002 FIFA World Cup. They finished 2nd in the region, behind Argentina and ahead of Brazil, to qualify to their first FIFA World Cup.

Copa América

Ecuador was drawn into Group A with hosts Colombia, Chile, and Venezuela. After finishing third in the group, as well has the third best third-place team, they were eliminated in the Group Stage.

Friendlies

External links
 National leagues details on RSSSF

 
2001